Xiao Yaqing (born September 1959) is a former Chinese engineer, business executive and politician who served as Minister of Industry and Information Technology from 2020 to 2022. Previously he served as director of the State Administration for Market Regulation and State-owned Assets Supervision and Administration Commission. He was an alternate member of the 17th Central Committee of the Chinese Communist Party and a member of the 18th Central Commission for Discipline Inspection of the Chinese Communist Party.

Early life and education
Xiao was born in Xinle County, Hebei, in September 1959. He entered Central-South Institute of Mining and Metallurgy (now Central South University) in 1978, majoring in non ferrous metal pressure machining at the Metallic Materials Department, where he graduated in 1982.

Executive career
Beginning in August 1982, he served in several posts at the Northeast Lightalloy Fabrication Plant in Harbin, including engineer, deputy chief engineer, chief engineer, and general manager.

In June 1999, he was transferred to Southwestern Aluminium Fabrication Plant in Chongqing, where he eventually promoted to December 2000. Under his management, the company turned losses into profits and ranked among China's top 500 enterprise groups.

In October 2003, he became deputy general manager of Aluminum Corporation of China Limited, rising to general manager the next year.

Political career
In February 2009, he was appointed deputy secretary-general of the State Council, after this office was terminated in January 2016, he became director of the State-owned Assets Supervision and Administration Commission, serving until May 2019, when he was named director of the State Administration for Market Regulation. In July 2020, he was appointed party branch secretary of the Ministry of Industry and Information Technology, concurrently holding the minister position since August 2021.

Investigation
On 28 July 2022, Xiao was put under investigation for suspected "violation of discipline and law" by the Central Commission for Discipline Inspection (CCDI), the party's internal disciplinary body, and the National Supervisory Commission, the highest anti-corruption agency of China. On 18 December 2022, he was expelled from the CCP and dismissed from public office. He was downgraded to a first-level chief section member.

References

1959 births
Living people
People from Xinle
Engineers from Hebei
Businesspeople from Hebei
Central South University alumni
People's Republic of China politicians from Hebei
Chinese Communist Party politicians from Hebei
Government ministers of the People's Republic of China
Alternate members of the 17th Central Committee of the Chinese Communist Party